Peripsocus alboguttatus is a species of Psocoptera from the Peripsocidae family that can be found in Austria, Belgium, Croatia, Denmark, Finland, France, Germany, Great Britain, Greece, Hungary, Ireland, Italy, Latvia, Luxembourg, Madeira, Norway, Poland, Romania, Spain, Sweden, Switzerland, and the Netherlands. The species are brown coloured.

References 

Peripsocidae
Insects described in 1823
Psocoptera of Europe